Eboni is a female given name. Notable people with this name include:

 Eboni Boykin
 Eboni Deon, American meteorologist
 Eboni Foster, member of Nuttin' Nyce
 Eboni Stocks, winner of Australia's Next Top Model (season 2)
 Eboni Usoro-Brown (born 1988), English netball player
 Eboni K. Williams, American celebrity

Feminine given names